This is a list of notable Icelandic sweets and desserts. The cuisine of Iceland refers to food preparation originating from Iceland or having played a great historic part in Icelandic cuisine. Iceland also shares many dishes and influences with surrounding Scandinavian countries, such as Norway, Sweden, and Denmark.

Characteristics
Due to Nordic settlements in Iceland during the 9th century, and due to an influx of Danish merchants and settlement in Iceland during its development, Scandinavia has a heavy influence in Icelandic cuisine. The earliest published Icelandic cookbooks were collections of Danish recipes brought by Danish bakers and traders--many of which still hold up in Icelandic dining today.

The climate of Iceland is harsh and frigid, therefore the culture relies heavily on animal products rather than large-scale crop farming. This is reflected in their desserts, as most dishes, such as skyr and súkkulaði, feature a dairy component. This is also reflected in the fruits used in dessert preparation, as only fruits that can grow in such a climate can be featured, such as crowberries, blueberries, and rhubarb. While cereals and grains are used in dishes, they are mainly created using imported grains, and therefore have become more popular as trade in Iceland has improved.

Icelandic desserts

Gallery

See also
 Icelandic cuisine
 List of desserts

References

 
Iceland